The men's marathon at the 1976 Summer Olympics in Montreal, Canada, was held on Saturday July 31, 1976. The race started at 17:30 local time. There were 67 competitors from 36 countries. Seven of them did not finish. The maximum number of athletes per nation had been set at 3 since the 1930 Olympic Congress. The event was won by Waldemar Cierpinski of East Germany, the first Olympic marathon medal by any German runner. Frank Shorter of the United States and Karel Lismont of Belgium became the third and fourth men to win a second medal in the event, each one place behind their 1972 results. Ethiopia's four-Games marathon medal streak ended, as the nation boycotted the Games.

Background

This was the 18th appearance of the event, which is one of 12 athletics events to have been held at every Summer Olympics. Returning runners from the 1972 marathon included defending champion Frank Shorter of the United States, silver medalist Karel Lismont of Belgium, and eighth-place finisher Jack Foster of New Zealand. Shorter had also won four consecutive Fukuoka Marathons from 1971 through 1974 and was favored in this race. Significant contenders included his countryman Bill Rodgers (1975 Boston Marathon winner), Jerome Drayton of Canada (1975 Fukuoka winner), and Akio Usami (9th in 1968 and 12th in 1972) and Shigeru So of Japan. Lasse Virén had just finished defending the double in the 5000 metres and 10000 metres; having never run a marathon before, he entered this event hoping to match Emil Zátopek's 1952 triple.

Bermuda, Honduras, Papua New Guinea, and Paraguay each made their first appearance in Olympic marathons. The United States made its 18th appearance, the only nation to have competed in each Olympic marathon to that point.

Competition format and course

As all Olympic marathons, the competition was a single race. The marathon distance of 26 miles, 385 yards was run over an out-and-back route.

Records

These were the standing world and Olympic records prior to the 1976 Summer Olympics.

Waldemar Cierpinski set a new Olympic best with 2:09:55.0.

Schedule

It rained throughout the race.

All times are Eastern Daylight Time (UTC-4)

Results

References

External links
  Official Report
  Marathon Info

M
Marathons at the Olympics
Men's marathons
Oly
Men's events at the 1976 Summer Olympics